Michael X Franzini, known professionally as mike X is an American author, coach, speaker and content creator based in Venice Beach.

He previously ran X-UP, a creative firm with offices in LA, Austin and New York. Current and past clients include Google, MTV, Panasonic, Rock the Vote, Walmart, and Partnership for a Drug Free America.

YouTube Channel and Blog 
Mike X regularly releases personal development videos on his YouTube channel and publishes related articles on his blog.

MTV Partnership 
Michael X Franzini's work with MTV has won numerous nominations and two Emmies.

To address young people's lack of awareness of the Holocaust, Franzini partnered with MTV and the creative group at Arnold Worldwide and Crispin Porter + Bogusky behind the Truth anti-tobacco campaign  to make the Holocaust more relevant to American teens today. He created a series of TV spots that portray events from the Holocaust taking place in a modern setting.  Each spot ends with a freeze-frame that dissolves to an actual historical black and white photograph from the Holocaust.

To combat teens' indifference to the threat of STD's, Franzini and MTV created a campaign in which teens were shown recklessly refusing protection in non-sexual contexts, such as riding a roller coaster and going shark diving.

The New York Times quoted Stephen Friedman, now President of MTV, describing Franzini's unique connection with the MTV demographic: "Mike gets our audience."

Work as CEO and Executive Creative Director for nonprofit ad agency Public Interest

In 1998, along with Jon Kamen and Frank Scherma, the founders of @radical.media, Franzini founded Public Interest, a 501(c)3 nonprofit dedicated to creating advertising for good causes, where he managed a staff of more than 50 people.

Work with Will.i.am 

In 2012, Franzini wrote and directed TV spots featuring Will.i.am to motivate young Americans to get interested in math and science, as a means of addressing America's STEM crisis.

Work as organizer of Global Online Town Hall with Al Gore

On behalf of Time Warner Cable, Franzini organized an online town hall meeting with Al Gore.  Franzini wrote talking points for Gore and directed Gore in the one-hour live event.

Work with Bill and Melinda Gates

He was Executive Creative Director of the STAND UP Campaign to improve America's education system. The Bill and Melinda Gates Foundation unveiled the STAND UP Campaign on The Oprah Winfrey Show on April 11 & 12, 2006.

Work with Elton John and Mary J Blige

Michael X Franzini created a campaign entitled "The White Bedroom" featuring Elton John and Mary J Blige, in which real people cast from the sidewalks of New York City sit in a sleek white bedroom and share secrets about their sex lives.

The I KNOW Guerrilla Marketing Campaign 

In possibly the first viral campaign to use currency as its medium, Franzini minted 250,000 coins resembling pennies and entered them into circulation in New York City.  He made a X-Up Case Study: Currency as an advertising medium – X-Up: Creative Vision about the campaign.

Rock the Vote Partnership 

Working with Rock the Vote in Los Angeles to shed light on young people's attitudes towards discrimination and bias, Franzini organized a social experiment in which kids at a skate park were segregated by security guards according to eye color. The surprising result was that virtually all of the kids complied without any objection.

In another setting—at a drive-through hot-dog establishment in the San Fernando Valley—Franzini put up signs that read "customers with foreign accents will be charged double" next to the menu board.  In this case, the outcome was that no passive bystander (i.e. individual not being charged double) objected to the policy.  (The money was returned to the customers after the transaction.)

The New York Times and The Los Angeles Times covered the experiment.

GUNPOWDER: The Power of Guayusa

Franzini founded this company and served as its CEO.

Teen lifestyle photography

Wall-sized prints of his photographs have appeared in retail locations such as Pacific Sunwear, a chain of more than 800 retail stores targeting teens and young adults.

Franzini's photographs documenting American youth culture have also been exhibited at Nike's Beaverton, OR campus and the offices of McCann Erickson J3 in New York City.

His images have appeared in art galleries around the world, including Peter Hay Halpert Fine Art.

Youth culture

Franzini often speaks and consults on marketing to teens.  He delivered the Keynote Address at the Ypulse Youth Mashup, an event for marketers trying to reach young Americans. He also spoke on U.S. youth culture at the Southern Growth Conference, at annual event attended by the governors of 13 Southern States.

Baby photography

In 2011, Johnson & Johnson hired Michael X Franzini to travel to all 50 states to photograph one baby in each state. Each baby was photographed with one or both parents, sharing a moment of "everyday joy."  The book was launched on The View on Mother's Day 2011.

Norman, the puppy that moos 

Tim Gill, creator of Quark and founder of the Gill Foundation, gave Franzini a budget of US$1M to "move the needle" on attitudes towards marriage equality, in Colorado Springs, which is widely considered the epicenter of anti-gay sentiment in America, because it is the location of the headquarters of Focus on the Family.

Franzini assembled a team that created a fictional dog named Norman, who happened to be born different: instead of barking, he moos.  Norman came to life in five TV spots, on billboards, banners on downtown street lamps, yard signs and via guerilla advertising.

The campaign succeeded in changing public opinion and sparked an international controversy and led to an announcement by James Dobson, head of Focus on the Family, that he had a dog named Sherman, who barks, because God intended for dogs to bark.

Dobson explained that, if Sherman ever felt tempted to moo, he would take steps to cure himself of this unnatural behavior.

Books 

Michael X Franzini is the author of the following books:
One Hundred Young Americans, published by HarperCollins. The book is a first-hand account of youth culture in America.  It profiles one hundred teenagers in all fifty states.  More than two hundred images show every kind of teenager from every part of the United States, mirroring census data for gender, race, religion and sexual orientation, balanced across urban, rural, suburban and small-town locations.
Wounded Warriors, a photo essay created for the Wounded Warrior Project on soldiers wounded in Iraq and Afghanistan.
Young Americans, a glossy 12"x12" coffee table book of images of California teens.
 "Faces", a collection of images Franzini shot for T-mobile.
 "Treasuring Everyday Joy", a collection of images Franzini shot for Johnson's Baby in all 50 states.

References

External links 

 

20th-century American businesspeople
20th-century American writers
21st-century American businesspeople
21st-century American non-fiction writers
American business writers
American education businesspeople
American motivational speakers
American motivational writers
American self-help writers
Business speakers
Businesspeople from Los Angeles
Life coaches
Living people
Relationship education
Writers from Los Angeles
American film directors
American photographers
American advertising executives
Articles containing video clips
Year of birth missing (living people)